The 2012 Spruce Grove Cashspiel was held from November 23 to 25 at the Spruce Grove Curling Club in Spruce Grove, Alberta as part of the 2012–13 World Curling Tour. Both the men's and women's events were held in a round robin format, and the purses for the men's and women's events were CAD$8,000 each, with the winner of each event receiving CAD$2,100. In the men's final, Les Rogers defeated Greg Keith with a score of 6–3 for his first World Curling Tour title. In the women's final, Tiffany Steuber defeated Holly Whyte with a score of 8–7 in an extra end.

Men

Teams
The teams are listed as follows:

Round-robin standings
Final round-robin standings

Playoffs
The playoffs draw is listed as follows:

Women

Teams
The teams are listed as follows:

Round-robin standings
Final round-robin standings

Playoffs
The playoffs draw is listed as follows:

References

External links

2012 in curling
Spruce Grove
Curling in Alberta